In crystallography, the orthorhombic crystal system is one of the 7 crystal systems. Orthorhombic lattices result from stretching a cubic lattice along two of its orthogonal pairs by two different factors, resulting in a rectangular prism with a rectangular base (a by b) and height (c), such that a, b, and c are distinct. All three bases intersect at 90° angles, so the three lattice vectors remain mutually orthogonal.

Bravais lattices

There are four orthorhombic Bravais lattices: primitive orthorhombic, base-centered orthorhombic, body-centered orthorhombic, and face-centered orthorhombic.

For the base-centered orthorhombic lattice, the primitive cell has the shape of a right rhombic prism; it can be constructed because the two-dimensional centered rectangular base layer can also be described with primitive rhombic axes. Note that the length  of the primitive cell below equals  of the conventional cell above.

Crystal classes

The orthorhombic crystal system class names, examples, Schönflies notation, Hermann-Mauguin notation, point groups, International Tables for Crystallography space group number, orbifold notation, type, and space groups are listed in the table below.

In two dimensions 

In two dimensions there are two orthorhombic Bravais lattices: primitive rectangular and centered rectangular.

See also
Crystal structure
Crystal system
Overview of all space groups

References

Further reading
 

Crystal systems